Melanosis is a form of hyperpigmentation associated with increased melanin.

It can also refer to:
 Melanism
 Ocular melanosis
 Smoker's melanosis
 Oral melanosis
 Riehl melanosis

See also 

 List of cutaneous conditions

References

External links 

Dermatologic terminology